St. Michael's School is a private day and boarding school for pupils aged from 3 to 18 years old in Llanelli, Wales.

The school is divided into four sections, comprising the Pre-Preparatory School, Preparatory School, Senior School and Sixth Form. The current head teacher is Benson Ferrari.

History 
The school was first established in 1923 and has been situated in the east Llanelli village of Bryn since 1928. The school was originally established by the Rees brothers, with Percy Rees as the founding Headmaster. Upon retirement of the Rees' brothers, former head boy Mr Vaughan-Evans was appointed Headmaster in 1962.

The school's main building, St. David's House, dates back to the 19th century and was originally a large house belonging to a local industrialist.  The school's Pre-Preparatory School is housed in a converted former public house, The Royal Oak, which was purchased by the school in 2012

Ownership 
The school was acquired in 2019 by Chinese company Bright Scholar, as part of a £150m purchase of colleges in the UK. Bright Scholar is also the largest operator of international and bilingual schools in China. The deal for St Michael's, along with Bosworth Independent College, specifically cost the company a sum of £38m.

Results 
The school offers GCSE and A-Level qualifications, with 60.9% of all A-Level entries graded A* or A in 2018, winning the Sunday Times 2018 Welsh Independent Secondary School of the Year award.

Incidents 
In 2012 the school appeared in national headlines after accusations arose that education officers at Cognita UK, a rival education company, had posed as parents at St Michael's in order to obtain commercial information. Cognita at the time operated nearby Ffynone House School in Swansea but denied all of the allegations.

In 2016 the school was twice the victim of hoax calls warning of a bomb on the school estate. The school twice evacuated its premises, and a heavy police presence was required to confirm the communications were both in fact a hoax. The threat was linked to a number of other hoaxes around that time including threats to schools in Kent and Newcastle.

Notable former pupils
Notable former pupils of St Michaels' include:

Robert Buckland MP, politician, Lord Chancellor
Cerys Matthews, singer
Kirsty Williams AM, politician, Minister for Education and Skills for Wales
Ivor Richard, politician and diplomat, British Ambassador to the United Nations
John Geoffrey Jones, British judge, president of the Mental Health Review Tribunal for England and Wales
Siân Gwenllian AM, politician

St Michael's alumna and singer Cerys Matthews has acknowledged in interviews that her career benefited from attending St. Michael's, because "through the public school system, you've had so many leg ups", and avoids playing music by privately educated acts on her 6 Music show. She is subsequently an advocate for state educated acts in the music industry.

References

External links 
 Official website

Boarding schools in Wales
Llanelli
1923 establishments in Wales
Schools in Carmarthenshire